Implosion is a process in which objects are destroyed by collapsing (or being squeezed in) on themselves. The opposite of explosion (which expands the volume), implosion reduces the volume occupied and concentrates matter and energy. True implosion usually involves a difference between internal (lower) and external (higher) pressure, or inward and outward forces, that is so large that the structure collapses inward into itself, or into the space it occupied if it is not a completely solid object. Examples of implosion include a submarine being crushed from the outside by the hydrostatic pressure of the surrounding water, and the collapse of a massive star under its own gravitational pressure. 

An implosion can propel material outward (for example due to the force of inward falling material rebounding, or peripheral material being ejected as the inner parts collapse), but this is not an essential component of an implosion and not all kinds of implosion will do so. If the object was previously solid, then implosion usually requires it to take on a more dense form - in effect to be more concentrated, compressed, denser, or converted into a new material that is denser than the original.

Examples

Nuclear weapons
In an implosion-type nuclear weapon design, a sphere of plutonium, uranium, or other fissile material is imploded by a spherical arrangement of explosive charges. This decreases the material's volume and thus increases its density by a factor of two to three, causing it to reach critical mass and create a nuclear explosion.

In some forms of thermonuclear weapons, the energy from this explosion is then used to implode a capsule of fusion fuel before igniting it, causing a fusion reaction (see Teller–Ulam design). In general, the use of radiation to implode something, as in a hydrogen bomb or in laser driven inertial confinement fusion, is known as radiation implosion.

Fluid dynamics
Cavitation (bubble formation/collapse in a fluid) involves an implosion process. When a cavitation bubble forms in a liquid (for example, by a high-speed water propeller), this bubble is typically rapidly collapsed—imploded—by the surrounding liquid.

Astrophysics
Implosion is a key part of the gravitational collapse of large stars, which can lead to the creation of supernovae, neutron stars and black holes. 

In the most common case, the innermost part of a large star (called the core) stops burning and without this source of heat, the forces holding electrons and protons apart are no longer strong enough to do so. The core collapses in on itself exceedingly quickly, and becomes a neutron star or black hole; the outer layers of the original star fall inwards and may rebound off the newly created neutron star (if one was created), creating a supernova.

Controlled structure demolition

Large buildings of various structural types such as masonry, steel frame, or reinforced concrete may be reduced to an easily removed pile of rubble by selective destruction of supporting elements by sequenced and confined explosions. The goal is to confine the materials to specific areas, usually to avoid harm to nearby structures. The technique involves the firing of precisely placed demolition charges in specific timed intervals that use gravity to cause the center of the building to fall vertically while simultaneously pulling the sides inward, a process often erroneously described as an implosion.

Cathode ray tube and fluorescent lighting implosion 
A high vacuum exists within all cathode ray tubes. If the outer glass envelope is damaged, a dangerous implosion may occur. Due to the power of the implosion, glass pieces may launch outwards at dangerous velocities. While modern CRTs used in televisions and computer displays have epoxy-bonded face-plates or other measures to prevent shattering of the envelope, CRTs removed from equipment must be handled carefully to avoid personal injury.

See also 
 Type II supernova

References

External links
 Converging Shock Waves

Mechanics